Georges Auric (15 February 1899 – 23 July 1983) was a French composer, born in Lodève, Hérault, France. He was considered one of Les Six, a group of artists informally associated with Jean Cocteau and Erik Satie. Before he turned 20 he had orchestrated and written incidental music for several ballets and stage productions. He also had a long and distinguished career as a film composer.

Early life and education
Georges Auric began his musical career at a young age, performing a piano recital at the Société musicale indépendante at the age of 14. Several songs that he had written were then performed in the following year by Société Nationale de Musique. Along with his early successes professionally, Auric studied music at the Paris Conservatoire, as well as composition with Vincent d'Indy at the Schola Cantorum de Paris and Albert Roussel. Having gained recognition as a child prodigy both in composition and piano performance, he became a protégé of Erik Satie during the following decade. During the 1910s and 20s, he was a significant contributor of avant-garde music in Paris and was significantly influenced by Cocteau and the other composers of Les Six.

Career

Auric's early compositions were marked by a reaction against the musical establishment and the use of referential material. Because of this and his association with Cocteau and Satie, Auric was grouped into Les Six by music critic Henri Collet, and was friends with the artist Jean Hugo. His participation led to writing settings of poetry and other texts as songs and musicals. Along with the other five composers, he contributed a piece to L'Album des Six. In 1921, Cocteau asked him to write the music for his ballet, Les Mariés de la tour Eiffel. He found himself short of time, so he asked his fellow composers of Les Six to contribute some music. All except Louis Durey agreed. During this time, he wrote his one-act opera Sous le masque (1927) (an earlier opera, La Reine de coeur (1919), is lost). It was also in 1927 that he contributed the Rondeau for the children's ballet L'Éventail de Jeanne, a collaboration between ten French composers. In 1952 he participated in yet another collaboration, the set of orchestral variations La Guirlande de Campra. Les Six, though an informal and short-lived group, became known for its reaction against the musical establishment of the time and the promotion of absurdism and satire; the group rebelled similarly against Wagner as it did against Debussy. The music of these composers, including Auric, represented the specific cultural scene of Paris at the time and rejected the international styles brought by Russian and German music, as well as the impressionism and symbolism of Debussy. Auric's later development as a populist composer was prefigured by many of the techniques and ideals of Les Six, especially the use of popular music and situations. Music of the circus or the dance hall played a significant role in the music of Les Six, especially in their actual collaborations. However, Les Six soon drew apart, with Auric and others taking different approaches to their art.

Following his early successes as an avant-garde composer, Auric went through a transitional period during the 1930s. He began writing for film in 1930 and composed the music for À Nous la Liberté in 1931, which was well received; there was general approval of Auric's score for the film. While he was beginning a successful career as a film composer, his music went through a period of stagnation and change. His Piano Sonata (1931) was poorly received and was followed by a period of five years in which he wrote very little, including his first three film scores. His association with Cocteau continued through this period with his composition of the score to Cocteau's Le Sang d'un poète. However, he abandoned the elitist and highly referential attitudes of his earlier years by 1935 in favour of a populist approach. He became associated with leftist groups and publications, including the Association des Ecrivains et des Artistes Révolutionnaires (AEAR), the Maison de la Culture, and the Fédération Musicale Populaire. He adopted four strategies to composing; first, to participate in groups with other leftist artists; second, to reach a wider audience by writing in more genres; third, to write music aimed at a younger audience; and fourth, to express his political views more directly in his music.

The films that Auric chose to score in his career as a film composer were influenced by these new-found beliefs, as well as by old associations. He collaborated with Jean Cocteau, his longtime associate from the days of Les Six, on eleven films. He composed music for a large number of films over the years, including films produced in France, England, and America. Among his most popular scores is the score for Moulin Rouge. The song from that movie, "Where Is Your Heart?", became very popular. In 1962, he gave up writing for motion pictures when he became director of the Opéra National de Paris and then chairman of SACEM, the French Performing Rights Society. Auric continued to write classical chamber music, especially for winds, right up to his death.

Music criticism was another major facet of Auric's career. His criticism was focused on promoting the ideals of Les Six and Cocteau, known as esprit nouveau. Specifically, his criticism focused on the perceived pretentiousness of Debussy, Wagner, Saint-Saëns, and Massenet, as well as the music of those who followed their styles. Cocteau, Les Six, and Auric found the music of those composers to be divorced from reality and instead preferred music that was grounded in populism.

Personal life and politics
While Auric criticized Satie in the 1920s for joining the French Communist Party, he became associated with several leftist groups and contributed to the communist newspapers Marianne and Paris-Soir in the 1930s. The Association des Ecrivains et des Artistes Révolutionnaires (AEAR) was dedicated to bringing together Soviet and French communist artists to discuss their goals and approaches for disseminating their ideas to the public. It was through this group that Auric met many other far left artists and thinkers. These ideals transferred into Auric's concert music as well as his choices in which movies he scored. In 1930, Auric married the painter Eleanore Vilter, who died in 1982. Auric died in Paris on 23 July 1983 at the age of 84, and was interred at Montparnasse Cemetery, beside his wife.

Selected works
 Trois Interludes for piano and voice (1914)
 Huit Poèmes de Jean Cocteau for piano and voice (1918)
 Adieu, New-York! for piano (1919)
 Prélude for piano (1919)
 Les joues en feu for piano and voice (1920)
 Ouverture and Ritournelle from Les Mariés de la Tour Eiffel for orchestra (1920)
 Pastorales for piano (1920)
 Sonatine for piano (1922)
 Les Fâcheux (Ballet) (1923)
 Cinq Bagatelles for piano 4 hands (1925)
 Les Matelots (Ballet) (1925)

Selected filmography
A more complete list is in the French Wikipedia article on Georges Auric .

 Le sang d’un poète (1930)
 À nous la liberté (1931)
 Lake of Ladies (1934)
 The Mysteries of Paris (1935)
 The Messenger (1937)
 The Alibi (1937)
 The Red Dancer (1937)
 The Lafarge Case (1938)
 His Uncle from Normandy (1939)
 The Beautiful Adventure (1942)
 The Murderer is Afraid at Night (1942)
 L'Éternel retour (1943)
 François Villon (1945)
Farandole (1945)
 Dead of Night (1945)
 Beauty and the Beast (1946)
 Pastoral Symphony (1946)
 Hue and Cry (1947)
 The Seventh Door (1947)
 Desert Wedding (1948)
 To the Eyes of Memory (1948)
 Passport to Pimlico (1948)
 Ruy Blas (1948)
 Maya (1949)
 The Queen of Spades (1949)
 Silent Dust (1949)
 The Spider and the Fly (1949)
 Orpheus (1950)
 The Lavender Hill Mob (1951)
 Darling Caroline  (1951)
 The Galloping Major (1951)
 Moulin Rouge (1952)
 Leathernose (1952)
 The Titfield Thunderbolt (1953)
 Roman Holiday (1953)
 The Slave (1953)
 The Wages of Fear (1953)
 The Divided Heart (1954)
 Lola Montes (1955)
 Rififi (1955)
 The Hunchback of Notre Dame (1956)
 Bonjour Tristesse (1958)
 The Night Heaven Fell (1958)
 Next to No Time (1958)
 Sergeant X (1960)
 Final Accord (1960)
 Goodbye Again (1961)
 The Innocents (1961)
 The Mind Benders (1963)
 The Poppy Is Also a Flower (1966)
 The Christmas Tree (1969)

See also
 List of French composers

References

External links

 
 
 

1899 births
1983 deaths
20th-century classical composers
French ballet composers
Burials at Montparnasse Cemetery
Conservatoire de Paris alumni
French male classical composers
French communists
French film score composers
French opera composers
Male opera composers
Les Six
French male film score composers
People from Lodève
Schola Cantorum de Paris alumni
Ballets Russes composers
Members of the Royal Academy of Belgium
Directors of the Paris Opera
20th-century French male musicians
Occitan musicians